Lancovo is a settlement on the right bank of the Sava River, opposite Radovljica in the Upper Carniola region of Slovenia.

There is a late Gothic church dedicated to St. Lambert, originally built around 1500 but rebuilt in the 17th century. There are also castle ruins close to the church.

The Commission on Concealed Mass Graves in Slovenia has also revealed a site with mass graves with remains of bodies of hundreds of victims of political killings from the period immediately after the Second World War in Zgornja Lipnica near Lancovo.

References

External links

Lancovo at Geopedia

Populated places in the Municipality of Radovljica